"There's a Story (Goin' 'Round)" is a song recorded by American country music artists Dottie West and Don Gibson. It was released in November 1969 and peaked at number 7 on the Billboard Hot Country Singles chart. The single was never released on an official album.

Chart performance

References

1969 singles
Dottie West songs
Don Gibson songs
Male–female vocal duets
Songs written by Don Gibson
1969 songs